Valerie Miles (New York, 1963) is a publisher, writer, translator and the co–founder of Granta en español. She is known for promoting Spanish and Latin American literature and their translation in the English speaking world, at the same time as bringing American and British authors to Spain and Latin America for the first time, working with main publishing houses on the sector. She is currently the co-director of Granta en español and The New York Review of Books in its Spanish translation. On 2012 she co-curated a Roberto Bolaño exhibit at the Center for Contemporary Culture in Barcelona. In addition, she is a professor in the post-graduate program for literary translation at the Pompeu Fabra University in Barcelona.

Biography 
Born in New York, she grew up in Pennsylvania; before moving to Spain in 1990, where she began writing about British and American literature in La Vanguardia newspaper in 1994. Since then, Miles has published articles, interviews and reviews, also on Spanish language literature for ABC, La Nación, Reforma and El País.

Publishing 

In 1999, she started working as a publishing editor for Debolsillo, part of Random House Spain. In May 2001 she became publishing director at Emecé Editores (Planeta), where she published or promoted translations to Spanish of writers like John Cheever, Richard Yates, Yasunari Kawabata, Silvina Ocampo, Edgardo Cozarinsky, Lydia Davis, Monica Ali and Eliot Weinberger, among others. On 2006 she moved to Alfaguara, where she published John Banville, Joyce Carol Oates, Ngũgĩ wa Thiong'o, James Lasdun and Gary Shteyngart. Between 2008 and 2012, she was named publishing director of Duomo Ediciones, an imprint of the Italian group Mauri Spagnol, where she published both the work of young Spanish-language authors such as Carlos Yushimito, Sebastià Jovani and Rodrigo Hasbún and the work of English-language writers in Spain and Latin America, such as David Mitchell, Azar Nafisi, Nicholson Baker, Aleksandar Hemon, Jayne Anne Phillips, John Gray and William Boyd. She also published co-editions Spanish translations of books from the New York Review of Books collection of contemporary classics. In 2013, she was voted one of the "Most Influential Professionals in Publishing" by the Buenos Aires Book Fair.

Granta 

Valerie Miles founded Granta en español in 2003 together with Aurelio Major. Project has been sponsored by Emecé, Alfaguara, Duomo and now by Galaxia Gutenberg in Barcelona, Spain. The magazine has published nineteen issues so far, including the highly acclaimed selection of The Best of Young Spanish-language Novelists, In April 2014, it was announced that the publisher Galaxia Gutenberg would undertake the publications of the magazine.

Publications 

As a writer In 2014 she published A Thousand Forests in One Acorn, an anthology for which 28 writer Spanish-language writers chose a selection of their own work as representative, with comments by the authors and discussion of their influences. Participants include Mario Vargas Llosa, Javier Marías, Juan Goytisolo, Ana María Matute and Carlos Fuentes. Book was later translated to Romanian.

As a journalist, she has written articles and book reviews for The New York Times, The Paris Review, Harper´s, Granta, La Vanguardia, La Nación and the cultural supplement, ABCD.

As a translator, she has translated into English the work of authors such as Enrique Vila-Matas, Edmundo Paz Soldán, Lucía Puenzo and Fernando Aramburu for publishing houses such as New Directions and Granta.

Bibliography
A Thousand Forests in One Acorn (Rochester: Open Letter, 2014); Spanish edition, Mil bosques en una bellota, Duomo, Barcelona, 2012

References

External links 

 NPR Radio Talks to Valerie Miles about Granta 10

American women journalists
American publishers (people)
Writers from Pennsylvania
Living people
1963 births
Academic staff of Pompeu Fabra University
American women academics
21st-century American women